{{Infobox settlement
| official_name          = Valdivia
| other_name             = 
| native_name            = 
| nickname               = The City of Rivers, The Pearl of the South of Chile, Chile's Brewery Capital
| named_for              = Pedro de Valdivia
| motto                  = Muy Noble y Muy Leal("Most noble and most loyal")
| settlement_type        = City and Commune
| image_skyline          = Montaje de Valdivia.png
| image_caption          = From top to bottom, left to right: Valdivia waterfront, Town Square, Hotel Naguilán (top), Sciences Building of Austral University (bottom), Los Canelos tower, Rodolfo Amando Philippi Museum, Historical and Anthropologic Museum Maurice van de Maele, St. Francisco Church, Prochelle House, Dreams Hotel & Casino, Los Lotos Lagoon on Teja Island, Mapuche's Rewe, Botanical Garden of Valdivia.
| image_flag             = Flag of Valdivia, Chile.svg
| flag_size              = 
| image_shield           = Escudo de Valdivia.svg
| shield_size            = 
| image_map              = Comuna de Valdivia.svg
| map_caption            = Location of the Valdivia commune in Los Ríos Region
| map_alt                = Location of the Valdivia commune in Los Ríos Region
| pushpin_map            = Chile
| pushpin_map_narrow    = yes
| pushpin_mapsize       = 150
| pushpin_label_position = bottom
| pushpin_map_caption    = Location in Chile
| subdivision_type = Country
| subdivision_name = Chile
| subdivision_type1 = Region
| subdivision_name1 = Los Ríos
| subdivision_type2 = Province
| subdivision_name2 = Valdivia
| government_footnotes =
| government_type         = Municipality
| leader_title            = Alcaldesa
| leader_party = 
| leader_name = Carla Amtmann
| established_title = Founded as
| established_date = Santa María la Blanca de Valdivia
| established_title2 = Founded
| established_date2 = 9 February 1552
| unit_pref               = Metric
| area_footnotes          =
| area_total_km2          = 1015.6
| elevation_footnotes     = 
| population_footnotes    =
| population_total        = 150,048
| population_as_of        = 2017 Census
| population_density_km2  = auto
| population_demonym      = Valdivian
| population_blank1_title = Urban
| population_blank1       = 129952
| population_blank2_title = Rural
| population_blank2       = 10607
| demographics_type1      = Sex
| demographics1_footnotes =
| demographics1_title1    = Men
| demographics1_info1     = 68,510
| demographics1_title2    = Women
| demographics1_info2     = 72,049
| blank1_name             = Climate
| blank1_info             = Cfb
| timezone = CLT
| utc_offset = −04:00
| timezone_DST = CLST
| utc_offset_DST = −03:00
| coordinates             = 
| elevation_m = 5
| postal_code_type = Postal code
| postal_code = 5090000
| area_code = country 56 + city 63
| website = Municipality of Valdivia 
| footnotes = 
}}Valdivia''' (Mapuche: Ainil) is a city and commune in southern Chile, administered by the Municipality of Valdivia. Since October 2007, Valdivia has been the capital of Los Ríos Region and is also the capital of Valdivia Province. The national census of 2017 recorded the commune of Valdivia as having 166,080 inhabitants (Valdivianos), of whom  150,048  were living in the city. The main economic activities of Valdivia include tourism, wood pulp manufacturing, forestry, metallurgy, and beer production. The city is also the home of the Austral University of Chile, founded in 1954 and the Centro de Estudios Científicos.

The city of Valdivia and the Chiloé Archipelago were once the two southernmost outliers of the Spanish Empire. From 1645 to 1740 the city depended directly on the Viceroyalty of Peru, which financed the building of the Valdivian fort system that turned Valdivia into one of the most fortified cities of the New World. In the mid-19th century, Valdivia was the port of entry for German immigrants who settled in the city and surrounding areas.

In 1960 Valdivia was severely damaged by the Great Chilean earthquake, the most powerful earthquake ever recorded at magnitude 9.5. The earthquake caused c. 2 m of subsidence around Valdivia leaving large areas of former pastures and cultivated fields permanently flooded. Today there are various protected wetlands within the urbanised area of Valdivia as well as in its outskirts.

History

Pre-Hispanic times (12,000 BC – 1543)
The area around Valdivia may have been populated since 12,000 – 11,800 BC, according to archaeological discoveries in Monte Verde (less than 200 km south of Valdivia), which would place it about a thousand years before the Clovis culture in North America. This challenges the "Clovis First" model of migration to the New World. Researchers speculate that the first inhabitants of Valdivia and Chile travelled to America by watercraft and not across a land-bridge in the Bering Strait.

During at least the Middle Archaic, southern Chile was populated by indigenous groups who shared a common lithic culture called the Chan-Chan Complex, named for the archaeological site of Chan-Chan located some 35 km north of Valdivia along the coast. 

Ainil
By the time of the arrival of the Spanish conquistadores, Valdivia was inhabited by the Huilliche (Mapudungun for People of the South). The Huilliche and Mapuche were both referred to by the Spaniards as Araucanos. Their main language was a variant of Mapudungun, the Mapuche language.

A large village called Ainil stood where present-day downtown Valdivia has been developed. The Huilliche called the river, Ainilebu (now known as the Valdivia River). Ainil seemed to have been an important trade center; it was a port on the sea and had access to the interior via the network of the Cruces and Calle-Calle rivers, both tributaries of the Valdivia. Ainil may be described as "a kind of little Venice," as it had large areas of wetlands and canals. Since that period, most of these waterways and wetlands have been drained or filled. The market in Ainil received shellfish and fish from the coast, legumes from Punucapa, and other foods from San José de la Mariquina, an agricultural zone northeast of Valdivia. A remnant of this ancient trade is the modern Feria Fluvial (English: Riverside Market) on the banks of Valdivia River. The surroundings of Valdivia were described as extensive plains having a large population that cultivated potatoes, maize, quinoa and legumes, among other crops. He also stated that "there is not much cleared land near Valdivia" which contrasted with the description made by early Spaniards of large fields and extensive croplands.

The expansion and economic development of the city were limited in the early 19th century. To jump-start economic development, the Chilean government initiated a highly focussed immigration program under Bernhard Eunom Philippi and later Vicente Pérez Rosales as government agents. Through this program, thousands of Germans settled in the area, incorporating then-modern technology and know-how to develop agriculture and industry. While immigrants that arrived to the Llanquihue area were often poor farmers, Valdivia received more educated immigrants, including political exiles and merchants. Some of the immigrants that arrived in Valdivia established workshops and built new industries. One of the most famous immigrants was Carlos Anwandter, an exile from Luckenwalde who arrived in Valdivia in 1850 and in 1858 founded Chile's first German school. Other Germans left the city and became settlers, drawn by the promise of free land. They were often given forested land, which they cleared to turn into farms. Native Mapuche and Huilliche either sold their land or were pushed into reservations. The Osorno department of Valdivia Province was moved to Llanquihue Province (created in 1853) as consequence of German immigration to the Llaquihue area.

Valdivia prospered with industries, including shipyards, the Hoffmann gristmill, the Rudloff shoe factory, the Anwandter beer company and many more. The steel mills of Corral were the largest recorded private investment in Chile at the time, and were the first steel mills in South America. In 1891 Valdivia became a commune according to a law that created such subdivisions. After the Malleco Viaduct was built in 1890 the railroads advanced further south, reaching Valdivia in 1895. The first passenger train arrived in 1899. In 1909 a fire destroyed 18 city blocks in downtown Valdivia, which were rebuilt with modern concrete buildings. By 1911 lumber production, from clearing of native forests, became the most important industry. Cattle-raising was a growing industry, and wheat was grown on the cleared lands. Lumber, cattle, leather, flour and beer were exported. In 1895 the city's population was 8,062 inhabitants and was estimated at 9,704 in 1902.

The economic prosperity of Valdivia continued throughout the first half of the 20th century. In 1917 the first "Valdivian Week" (Spanish: Semana Valdiviana) was celebrated. Chile's oldest beauty contest, "Queen of The Rivers" (Spanish: Reina de Los Ríos) began the same year. The city evolved as an early tourist center in Chile, while popular songs that named Valdivia and the Calle-Calle River made it better known in Chilean popular culture. The Pedro de Valdivia Bridge crossing the Valdivia River was built in 1954. Valdivia came to be one of the most important industrial centers in Chile together with the capital Santiago and the main port city, Valparaíso.

The commercial and human flux Valdivia suffered two setbacks in the early 20th century, first the connection of Osorno by railroad to central Chile which meant that Valdivia lost the quality of being the port that connected Osono to Central Chile. Later on 1911 the opening of the Panama Canal meant a decrease in ship traffic all over Chile since ships travelling from the north Atlantic to north Pacific no longer had to pass through the Straits of Magellan or visit any Chilean port.

Great Chilean earthquake and Los Lagos Region (1960–2006)

On May 22, 1960, Chile suffered the most powerful earthquake ever recorded, rating 9.5 on the moment magnitude scale, with Valdivia being the most affected city. The earthquake generated devastating tsunamis that affected Japan and Hawaii. Spanish-colonial forts around Valdivia were severely damaged, while soil subsidence destroyed buildings, deepened local rivers, and created wetlands of the Río Cruces y Chorocomayo – a new aquatic park north of the city.

Large sections of the city flooded after the earthquake, and a landslide near the Tralcán Mount dammed the Riñihue Lake. Government authorities drew plans for evacuating the city, but many people left on their own. Danger to the city was reduced after a large team of workers opened a drainage channel in the landslide; water levels of the lake slowly returned to normal levels. There is evidence that a similar landslide and earthquake happened in 1575. After the Great Chilean earthquake Valdivia's economy and political status declined. Much of the city was destroyed and many inhabitants left.

The 1973 Chilean coup d'état and the military's actions that followed brought dozens of detainees to Valdivia and saw the imposing of a nationwide curfew. In October a group of 12 young men, among them José Gregorio Liendo, were brought from the Complejo Forestal y Maderero Panguipulli in the Andes to be executed in Valdivia by firing squad due to alleged participation in the assault on Neltume police station and "guerrilla activities".

By 1974, the military junta reorganized the political divisions of Chile and declared Valdivia a province of the Los Lagos Region with Puerto Montt as the regional capital. Many Valdivians resented the decision, and felt theirs should have been the legitimate regional capital—while Valdivia was founded in 1552, and had resisted pirate attacks, hostile natives and several earthquakes, Puerto Montt was a relatively new city founded only in 1853 (three hundred and one years later).

Since the liberalization of the economy in Chile in the 1980s the forestry sector in Valdivia boomed, first by exporting wood chips to Japan from Corral and then by producing woodpulp in Mariquina (50 km northeast of Valdivia). This led to deforestation and substitution of native Valdivian temperate rainforests to plant pines and eucalyptus, but also created new jobs for people with limited education. Valdivia also benefitted from the development of salmon aquaculture in the 1990s, but to a much lesser extent than places such as Puerto Montt and Chiloé.

Culture

Valdivia is often promoted for its unique characteristics, that make it different from other cities in Chile: Valdivia has an early Spanish colonial past, plus a later history of German colonization. Both eras left visible landmarks such as the forts of Corral Bay and the German-style wood houses. The governments of Spain and Germany currently maintain honorary consulates in Valdivia. The city is commonly seen as a tourist magnet in Chile, and sometimes described as La Perla del Sur (The Pearl of the South) and as La ciudad mas linda de Chile (Chile's most beautiful city).
Every year during the summer months of January and February the municipality organizes many free cultural events along the river site, such as concerts, sporting events, and other entertainment. To mark and celebrate the end of the touristic summer months, halfway through February all entertainment reaches its climax with the celebration of noche Valdiviana (Valdivian night). During this night many local groups and communities present themselves on boats during a night parade over the river. Every boat has its own theme related with one theme of that year. At the end a jury picks the winners in different categories. The parade is by tradition started by a boat which presents la reina de los ríos. In recent years Valdivians have showed an increasing interest in nature and ecotourism. An example of this was the formation of Acción por los Cisnes an ecologist group formed to protect black-necked swans and the natural environment that surrounds the city, particularly wetlands created or expanded by the Great Chilean earthquake. With the founding of Universidad Austral in 1954 and the arrival of the CECS research center, Valdivia is now considered a major research center in Chile, particularly in areas related to nature such a glaciology and ecology. The Great Chilean earthquake and the national government's creation of the Los Lagos Region were difficult for Valdivian society. Valdivians resented to be punished first by a major earthquake and then by being placed under the administration of what they perceived to be a less-deserving city, Puerto Montt. The recent creation of a new, smaller, but more independent region (Los Ríos), with Valdivia as its capital, reduced the previous stigma.

Valdivia's varied influences are reflected by its multicultural toponyms that include placenames of Mapuche, Spanish, Quechua and German origin.

Spanish colonial influences
During much of the colonial period, Valdivia was essentially a military camp, a walled city surrounded by hostile natives. The coastal defenses and their garrisons made up a large part of the population. After several fires and earthquakes, nearly all buildings from this period were destroyed, with the exception of the military defenses. Valdivia's best known historical landmarks are now the two towers which were part of a former city wall, built by the Spaniards to defend the city, known as Torreones: Torreón Los Canelos and Torreón del Barro.

German influences

Since the first Germans migrated to Valdivia in the mid-1840s, German cultural influence has been visible in the city. Germans in Valdivia settled mostly in the Isla Teja and Collico suburban areas. Until the building of Pedro de Valdivia Bridge, inhabitants of Isla Teja lived isolated from the city, where it was common that children first learned to speak German before Spanish. Nowadays the German language is preserved by the Instituto Alemán Carlos Anwandter one of Latin America's oldest German schools. German descendants also form Valdivia's oldest fire station Germania, located in Isla Teja.

German immigrants and their descendants formed their social club Club Alemán, which after World War II changed names to Club la Unión. German workers once had their own club simply called El Alemán (The German).

Valdivia also hosts Bierfest Valdivia, a celebration that could be described as a small, regional Oktoberfest, despite being celebrated in late January or February of every year (during the local summer, when there is the largest influx of tourists). The main sponsor and organizer is Kunstmann, a local beer company, founded by German nationals, but since bought out by the largest beer and beverages company in Chile (CCU).

 Literature 
The Valdivia Book Fair is organized annually by the Municipal Cultural Corporation in Parque Saval. Likewise, the Society of Writers of Chile, through its subsidiary Valdivia and with the collaboration of the Austral University of Chile, regularly holds literary gatherings, a space in which books are presented and local letters are shared with the student community. Several authors born in the Los Ríos Region also stand out in the city, such as Maha Vial, Iván Espinoza Riesco, José Baroja, Aldo Astete Cuadra, Efraín Miranda Cárdenas, among others.

Demography
Of these, 129,952 (92.5%) lived in urban areas and 10,607 (7.5%) in rural areas. Between the 1992 and 2002 censuses, the population grew by 15.1% (18,391 persons).

Within the population, the presence of descendants of migrants of German origin and of Spanish origin also stands out, colonies that are grouped into different social, educational, sports and cultural institutions. 

Geography

As part of the Chilean Patagonia, the geography of the Valdivia area consists of wetlands and alluvial terraces. Several rivers, such as Cau-Cau, Calle-Calle and Cruces, join near the city forming the larger Valdivia River. Valdivia River in turn empties to Corral Bay in the Pacific Ocean just some 15 km west of Valdivia. This river network made Valdivia a trade center even since Pre-Hispanic times. The city itself was built on a riverine terrace but expanded later over adjacent wetlands. Nowadays the city is virtually surrounded by hills by all sides except north where Valdivia's lowlands connect to the flatlands of San José de la Mariquina. Some hilly areas around Valdivia are covered with exotic forest species such as Douglas-fir, Pinus radiata and Eucalyptus globulus. Other places are used for recreational purposes or conservation of native ecosystems. Additional Northern Hemisphere exotic trees such as birch, horsechestnut and poplar are common in residential areas. Palms are occasional.

Parts of city is built on poor soils made up of former wetlands or artificial fills that are prone to suffer during earthquakes as demonstrated in 1960 and 2010.

Geology

Within the context of plate tectonics the city lies at a convergent margin where Nazca Plate in the Pacific is subducted beneath the South American Plate. Topographically Valdivia lies in a depression amidst the Chilean Coast Range. The basement rocks that crops out in the hills around the city are of metamorphic type. The city itself is chiefly built upon terraces made up of hardened volcanic sand. This volcanic sandstone is known as "cancagua" and deposited during the late Pleistocene epoch. As terraces took shape during the interglacial preceding the Llanquihue glaciation —the last glacial period— this interglacial is known in Chile as the Valdivia interglacial.

A tectonically and eustatically stable period during the Oligocene and Early Miocene allowed erosion to create deep valleys in the Coast Range and peat swamps at what is now the estuary of the Valdivia basin. About 23.5 million years ago this stable period was interrupted by a major volcanic eruption and 23 mya ago an increase in convergence rate at the Peru–Chile Trench caused an uplift of the landscape and renewed erosion. However basin subsidence and a marine transgression formed deep embayments, tidal flats, bayhead deltas and beaches.

Climate
Valdivia has a temperate rainy climate with Mediterranean influences. In short Valdivia features an oceanic climate with a distinct drying trend during the summer. A similar climate is found in the Willamette Valley and on the windward side of the Olympic Mountains in the Pacific Northwest region of North America. The natural vegetation is the Valdivian temperate rainforest.

Hail occurs with some frequency during winter, but snow falls rarely. The last times it snowed in Valdivia were in August 2020, July 2007, and in August 1995 during the so-called Terremoto Blanco (Spanish for White Earthquake). The Seven Lakes in the interior help to keep an average relative humidity of 80% for the region as whole and there are no months with less than 75% average humidity. The precipitation is generated by frontal systems that cross the zone, which produce cloudiness and few clear days. The leeward effect of the Valdivian Coast Range is minimal due to its low height (715 m at Cerro Oncol) and the gap in the range at Valdivia River's outflow to the Pacific Ocean. 

Decreasing precipitation has caused the city's water supply in Calle-Calle River to be contaminated with saline water from the coast. The effects of saline water entering the water supply of Valdivia were particularly noticeable in March 2015 when there was a surge in complains about the taste of the water. The saltwater in the rivers near Valdivia during autumn is expected to increase in the future. Estimations indicate that whenever the sum of the water discharge of Cruces and Calle-Calle rivers falls below  saltwater reaches the supply site at Cuesta Soto.

Government and politics
The commune of Valdivia is a third-level administrative division of Chile governed by a directly elected mayor (alcalde) and a municipal council (consejales). The city's current mayor is Carla Andrea Amtmann Fecci of the Democratic Revolution party.  The prior mayor was Omar Sabat Guzmán of the Independiente UDI.

Within the electoral divisions of Chile, Valdivia is represented in the Chamber of Deputies by Alfonso De Urresti (PS) and Roberto Delmastro (RN) as part of the 53rd electoral district, together with Lanco, Mariquina, Máfil and Corral.

The creation of Los Ríos Region and environmental issues have dominated the political scene of Valdivia in recent years. The communist lawyer Wladimir Riesco headed the legal actions against pulp mill enterprise CELCO after the deaths of black-necked swans in Carlos Anwandter Nature Sanctuary in 2004.

Ecological action
In response to the alleged contamination of Cruces River by the Celco cellulose pulp mill, a group of citizens formed the  Accion por los Cisnes (Action for the Swans) ecology group. Action for the Swans attracted the attention of the national newspapers and succeeded in temporarily closing down Valdivia Pulp Mill through a court order.

Economy and tourism

The city and commune of Valdivia rely heavily on silviculture, the pulp and paper industry and other forestry-related activities (the harvesting and processing of wood from nearby plantations of eucalyptus and Douglas firs). Large businesses such as CELCO, Bomasil and Louisiana-Pacific have established wood processing factories near Valdivia. Metallurgy, naval construction and repairs are also important industries, with the companies of Asenav and Alwoplast based in the area. Agroforestry/agriculture, livestock, aquaculture and food processing are lesser but also important industries that contribute to the region's economy. The chocolate company (Entrelagos) contributes to the image of the region, as does the brewing industry, a symbol of the area and another important part of the local economy, with Kunstmann the most famous brewery in Valdivia. Beer, along with cold cut meat and sausages, is part of the city's German heritage and is preserved as part of the local heritage. Trade, restaurants and hotels link to the tourism industry which represent an important part in Valdivia's growing economy.

Tourism

Valdivia is a historic tourist destination in Chile, valued for the beauty of the city and surrounding areas, the area's culture and its history. It is an all season city, but during the summer months in particular (December, January, February) tourism is a major source of income for Valdivia's economy. "Valdivian Week" (Spanish: Semana Valdiviana), as it has been known since 1917, is a long-held tradition that dates back to the foundation of the city. Starting  February 9 each year, it commemorates the city's anniversary and also gives Valdivia the chance to promote itself as a tourism center. "Semana Valdiviana" features an allegorical parade of ships – a tradition that began in the seventeenth century as a protest against the Spaniard authorities – and also includes a big artisan market, fairground rides, and the election of the "queen" of Los Rios. The week ends with fireworks and theatre performances on the closing night, known as "Noche Valdiviana" (Valdivian Night).
The center of the city has a rich architectural heritage. One of its most visited buildings is the "Mercado Municipal" ("municipal market"), a local produce market that is also now a gastronomic and cultural attraction. Also popular are the "Convento San Francisco" (Saint Francis Convent) and the European-style buildings dating back to the beginning of the 20th century, used today by the city's universities, cultural centers and government.
 

Education
Universities and colleges
Valdivia is home to several public and private schools and universities. The largest and oldest university is the Universidad Austral de Chile (UACh) that was founded by decree in 1954 as one of Chile's seven original Chilean Traditional Universities. Its main campus is located in Isla Teja but it has other minor campus and properties spread through the city and southern Chile. Since the liberalization of higher education in Chile in the 1980s other universities have established campuses in Valdivia, including Universidad Arturo Prat, Universidad San Sebastián, Universidad Santo Tomás and Universidad de Los Lagos.

Schools
Like in the rest of Chile, most of Valdivia's best schools are private. Instituto Alemán Carlos Anwandter (Deutsche Schule Valdivia) founded in 1858 is Chile's second oldest German school after the Instituto Alemán de Osorno (1854). Other notable private schools are Windsor School and Colegio San Luis de Alba. Among public schools Instituto Salesiano de Valdivia, Liceo Rector Armando Robles Rivera and Liceo Comercial have reached good results.

Sports
Facilities for playing football, tennis, rowing, rugby, golf, indoor swimming, indoor and outdoor basketball and some other sports are available throughout the area. Rowing is practiced in Valdivia in three clubs: Club Deportivo Phoenix Valdivia, Club Centenario de Remeros and Club Arturo Prat. Valdivian rowers Cristian Yantani and Miguel Cerda won the first place in Men's Lightweight Coxless Pair-Oared Shells at the world championship in Seville, 2002.

Club Deportivo Valdivia is Valdivia's main basketball team and plays in Chiles first division, DIMAYOR where it won the 2001 season. In 1977 and 2001 Valdivia hosted South Americas Men's Basketball Championship.

Transport
Roads and bridges

Most of Valdivia lies on the southern side of the Valdivia and Calle-Calle Rivers but other areas of the city, such as Isla Teja and Las Animas, are connected to it by bridges. The main access points to the city are Calle-Calle Bridge from the north and a southern route. Both connect the city with the Pan-American Highway and run through forested areas and wetlands. Route 207 runs from Valdivia southeast connecting the city with the town of Paillaco at the Route 5. 
 
Calle-Calle Bridge, the first bridge built in the city, connects Valdivia with Las Animas and forms the northern highway access to the city. Pedro de Valdivia Bridge was built in 1954 and connects the city with Isla Teja, where many German immigrants once lived. During the Great 1960 Valdivia earthquake only the minor Caucau Bridge (connecting Las Animas with Isla Teja) was destroyed, while all other bridges were repaired and are still in use. In 1987 Augusto Pinochet opened Río Cruces Bridge, making the coastal town of Niebla as well as Torobayo and Punucapa accessible by road. Calle-Calle Bridge, the main access to the city, was enlarged in the 1990s.

The new Caucau bridge was intended to provide a faster route from the city centre to the Pichoy airport via Isla Teja, but the faulty construction made it unusable.

Waterways
Until highway bridges were built, Valdivia's economy and citizens depended on boat traffic on the surrounding rivers, but with a contraction of bridges and highways, the river has lost its importance. Today, the rivers are used by the commercial ships built or repaired in Asenav, one of Chile's most important shipyard companies, and by tourist boats. Some of the locations that are regularly reached by tourist boats include Mancera Island and Punucapa.
Fishing boats also travel inland from the coast to the River Market. Today, just one ferry is still in operation, the Niebla–Corral line, as it is much quicker to reach Corral by ferry than by road.
 
Although in recent years the rivers have not had a major role in Valdivia's public transportation, a new private project is being developed by "Los Solares", an environmentally friendly company that operates solar-powered river taxis on Valdivia River. The project is called Transporte Fluvial Sustentable (TFS, or "Sustainable Water Transportation" in English). So far, the company has a fleet of three river taxis, and a small, sustainable and locally designed floating village that includes a pier, a café and the company's offices. The community produces its own electricity, water supply and processes its own wastewater with a bacterial solution.

Airports
The city is served mainly by Pichoy Airport, lying 32 km northeast of the city via the north entrance road that connects the city with the Pan American Highway. The smaller but much closer Las Marías Airport is used primarily by small aircraft, with no airlines operating there.

 Twin towns – sister cities 

Gallery

See also
 Ecotourism in the Valdivian Temperate Rainforest
 Flag of Valdivia
 Iglesia San Francisco de Valdivia
 Pilolcura
 Punucapa
 Valdivian Coastal Reserve

References

Notes

Sources
Francisco Solano Asta-Buruaga y Cienfuegos,  Diccionario geográfico de la República de Chile (Geographic dictionary of the Republic of Chile), SEGUNDA EDICIÓN CORREGIDA Y AUMENTADA, NUEVA YORK, D. APPLETON Y COMPAÑÍA, 1899. pg. 859–862 Valdivia – Ciudad
Brüggen, Juan. Fundamentos de la geología de Chile'', Instituto Geográfico Militar 1950.

External links

https://www.munivaldivia.cl/web/ 
  Ilustre Municipalidad de Valdivia
  Diario Austral de Valdivia, Valdivian newspaper
  Geology and geomorphology of Valdivia and Los Ríos Region
  Museo de Arte Contemporanea (MAC), a modern art museum
  Museo Fuerte Niebla, Niebla fort's museum
  Museo Philippi, a museum about the naturalist Rodolfo Armando Philippi
  La Librería de Valdivia, biggest bookstore in south of Chile
  Panorámicas de Valdivia en 360°
  Valdivia
  Museo de las Telecomunicaciones
  Anime related internet forum made in Valdivia
 Alwoplast, Valdivian designer/builder of custom catamarans
 Cerveza Kunstmann, local beer maker
 Valdivia Guide, an introductory guide for moving to Valdivia and Chile

 
Populated places in Valdivia Province
Capitals of Chilean regions
Communes of Chile
Capitals of Chilean provinces
Populated places established in 1552
1599 disestablishments
Port cities in Chile
Destroyed cities
1552 establishments in the Spanish Empire
South American sea lion colonies